Maurice John Crawley Vile (born 23 July 1927) is a British political scientist. His main areas of interest are constitutional theory, federalism, the separation of powers, American government and politics.

Early life
Vile was born on 23 July 1927 in Stoke Newington, East London, and moved to Victoria Park, South Hackney, three years later. His father Edward, was a packer at a textile warehouse, Jeremiah Rotherham and Company in Shoreditch, until it was destroyed in the Second World War. In 1938 he gained a London County Council Scholarship to Hackney Downs School and moved with the School when it was evacuated to Norfolk in 1939. In 1943 he returned to London and studied for a year at the Regent Street Polytechnic, before entering the London School of Economics, then relocated to Cambridge. 

In 1945 he enlisted in the Royal Armoured Corps, and was commissioned in 1947. He served with the 4th/7th Royal Dragoon Guards in Palestine until shortly before the creation of Israel in 1948.

Academic career 
Vile was successively a lecturer in government at the University of Exeter, a research fellow at Nuffield College, Oxford, and Professor of Political Science at the University of Kent. A founding member of the University of Kent, he became successively dean of social sciences, pro-vice chancellor and deputy vice chancellor. He has been a visiting professor at the University of Massachusetts, and at Smith College, as well as director of Boston University London Programmes, and research director at Canterbury Christ Church College (now University). He was made an honorary fellow of Canterbury Christ Church University in recognition of the role he played in its development. He is emeritus professor of political science in the University of Kent.

Publications: Books 

The Structure of American Federalism, Oxford University Press, 1961, 206pp.
Constitutionalism and the Separation of Powers, Clarendon Press, Oxford, 1967, 359pp.; Second edition with new chapter and bibliography, Liberty Fund, Indianapolis, 1998; Chinese edition, published by SDX Joint Publishing Company, Beijing, 1997; Spanish edition published by the Centro de Estudios 
Políticos y Constitucionales, Madrid, 2007.
Politics in the U.S.A., Allen Lane, 1970, Pelican Books edition, 1973; published by Hutchinsons, 1976; 6th. edition, Routledge, 2007, 237pp.  French edition: Le régime des Etats-Unis, Editions du Seuil, Paris 1972.
Federalism in the United States, Canada and Australia, Research paper no. 2, The Royal Commission on the Constitution, 1973, 48pp.
The Presidency: American Historical Documents, Vol. IV, Harraps, 1974, 210pp.
General Editor, The Penguin Interdisciplinary Readings, 5 volumes, Penguin Books, London.

References 

1927 births
Living people
Scientists from London
People from Stoke Newington
British political scientists
Academics of the University of Kent
Alumni of the London School of Economics
Academics of the University of Exeter
Fellows of Nuffield College, Oxford
Academics of Canterbury Christ Church University
British people in Mandatory Palestine
20th-century British Army personnel
4th/7th Royal Dragoon Guards officers
Royal Armoured Corps officers